A carburetor (American English) or carburettor (British English) is a device that mixes air and fuel for internal combustion engines in a suitable air–fuel ratio for combustion.

List 
 AMAL, producer of carburetors and hand controls for British motorcycles and light industrial engines.
 Autolite, a division of the Ford Motor Company from 1967 to 1973,. and from 1974 to 1985 by Motorcraft a division of Ford Motor Company
 Bendix Stromberg and Bendix Technico carburetors were used on aircraft and used on vehicles manufactured by Chrysler, International Harvester, Ford, GM, AMC, and Studebaker.
 Bing, Germany (Fritz Hintermayr GmbH Bing-Vergaser-Fabrik).
Carter, used on numerous makes of vehicles, including those made by Chrysler, IHC, Ford, GM, AMC, and Studebaker, as well as on industrial and agricultural equipment and small engines.
 Claudel-Hobson, UK.
 Dell'Orto carburetors from Italy, used on cars and motorcycles.
 Edelbrock performance carburetors.
 Hitachi, found on Japanese vehicles.
 Holley, with usage as broad as Carter and Weber.
 Keihin, a keiretsu group company affiliated with Honda.
 Mikuni, common on Japanese motorcycles, especially in the 1980s. Mikuni also made racing carburetors for Japanese, British and European cars. Original equipment on Mitsubishi engines.
 Reece Fish, in Volkswagen, Austin Mini, Morris Mini
 Rochester Products, a General Motors subsidiary; also sold Weber/Magneti Marelli carburetors under license)
 Solex – French carburetors, owned by Weber.
 SU Carburettors, widely used on British Commonwealth and European-designed vehicles.
 Villiers, used on UK motorcycles and small engines.
 Walbro and Tillotson carburetors for small engines.
 Weber carburetor, Italian, now made in Spain, owned by Magneti Marelli
 Wheeler–Schebler Carburetor Company.
 Zenith, used on Austin cars. Also produced the Zenith-Stromberg carburetors.
 Jikov, Czechoslovak, used in Škoda cars.

References

 
 
Carburetor
Engine fuel system technology
Engine components